The 2004 Individual Ice Speedway World Championship was the 39th edition of the World Championship  The Championship was held as a Grand Prix series over eight rounds.

Classification

See also 
 2004 Speedway Grand Prix in classic speedway
 2004 Team Ice Racing World Championship

References 

Ice speedway competitions
World